In the Slight is the second extended play by Australian indie rock band Spacey Jane, released independently on 10 November 2018. It was produced by Rob Grant and Dave Parkin, and preceded by two singles – "Cold Feet" and "Keep a Clean Nose".

Background 
The band's debut EP, No Way to Treat an Animal, was released in 2017. On 16 April 2018, the band released a double A-side, In the Meantime, featuring singles "Old Enough" and "So You Wanna". It was praised by music publication Pilerats for being "notably bright and summery", with "light-hearted melodies and soaring vocals". In June 2018, Spacey Jane performed at the State of the Art Festival in Western Australia.

Composition 

All five tracks on the EP were written by the band's Ashton Hardman-Le Cornu, Caleb Harper and Kieran Lama. It marked a minor sonic departure from the band's previous EP, No Way to Treat an Animal, a "garage pop odyssey" which was described by Nathan Robert of Pilerats as maintaining a "cleaner, harder rock sound". Instead, In the Slight has been described by Ali Shutler of NME as dabbling "with folk, emo and the decadence of ’00s indie".

Hardman-Le Cornu retrospectively admitted the band "gained a lot of maturity in the songwriting from the first to the second EP". Harper continued, in a press release:I definitely think we focussed a lot more heavily on the dynamic between our guitars and playing off each other. On the first EP we were really just playing lots of guitar, always, and we learnt to step back a little bit and try and work with each other better.Pilerats Hayden Davies observed that the EP's "dreamy shoegaze" tracks explore "every facet and groove of their summery, guitar-backed pop sound". His colleague Jacob Steenson specifically praised "Cold Feet" for its "engaging lyrics amidst just a damn fine slice of jangly indie-pop". "Sawteeth", the third track and most-streamed on Spotify, was praised by outlets for being notably "melancholic", with its "pensive lyricism making it a stand-out from the rest" according to Kaya Selin of The Backbeat Podcast. Writing for Sacred Exile, Brandon Sims noted that "Keep a Clean Nose" and "Neoprene" "help show off Harper’s talent by giving the vocals a bit more focus", and cited the Strokes and the Cure as noticeable influences.

Release 
As with the band's previous two releases, the cover artwork was designed by artist Alice Ford. Concerning the title of the EP, Harper explained it "came from emotions and intuitions that come out in one moment or second, unable to really be fully experienced again".

On 13 August and 12 October 2018, singles "Cold Feet" and "Keep a Clean Nose" were released. The latter was supported by a music video directed by George Foster. They held a launch party for the EP at the Rosemount Hotel in Perth on 10 November. Supporting the EP, the band embarked on the In the Slight Australian Tour in March 2019.

Track listing

Personnel 
Musicians

 Ashton Hardman-Le Cornu – writing, lead guitar
 Caleb Harper – writing, vocals, guitar
 Kieran Lama – writing, drums
 Amelia Murray – backing vocals, bass guitar

Technical

 Dave Parkin – producer, mixing 
 Rob Grant – producer, mixing ; mastering 
 Will Bowden – mastering 

Promotional

 Alice Ford – artwork

Release history

References 

2018 EPs
Albums produced by Dave Parkin
Indie rock EPs
Folk rock EPs
Spacey Jane albums